True Believer: The Rise and Fall of Stan Lee is a biography of Stan Lee written by Abraham Riesman.  Lee, who died in 2018, was a comic book writer, editor, and publisher.  Riesman, a comic book fan, had previously written several articles about comic books for Vulture.com, and her profile of Lee went viral.  The article was, in part, about how much input Lee had in the creation of Marvel Comics superheroes during the Silver Age of Comic Books.  True Believer was written as a followup and is a full biography of Lee's life.  Riesman interviewed Lee's surviving family members, former coworkers and business partners, and assistants who worked with his collaborators.  Riesman said the book was not intended to be a hatchet job but instead examines controversies in the comic book business, many of which have no proof either way, such as who created which characters.  Part of this is because the history of early comic book companies was not preserved, and part of it is because the Marvel Method of writing comic books, which gave artists creative freedom to plot stories, left authorship murky.

Reception 
Publishers Weekly called it a "detailed, clear-eyed examination" of interest to general audiences.  Stephanie Burt of The New Yorker described it as a künstlerroman that tackles a story that has become increasingly relevant to mainstream audiences who are not comics fans because of the billions of dollars involved in the Marvel Cinematic Universe.  Andy Lewis of the Los Angeles Times said it is "a well-researched, engrossing and compulsively readable book" but felt it focuses too much on scandalmongering and criticizing Lee.  Writing for USA Today, Barbara VanDenburgh said that the book "doesn't read like a takedown" and is an "absorbing read" even for non-comics fans.  Mike Avila of IGN wrote that it "offers an illuminating and often harsh look" at Lee, and Glen David Gold of The Washington Post called it an "excellent dig below the geniality that shows casual fans who he really was".  Jillian Steinhauer wrote in The New Republic that the book is "well-researched and thorough" but "feels like it's missing an emotional core".

Roy Thomas, a former editor-in-chief at Marvel and Lee's protégé, said the biography was 95% true, but the remaining 5% was so unfair to Lee that it rendered the book untrustworthy.

References

External links 
 
 

American biographies
Biographies about writers
Books about comics